Horace Haszard (November 2, 1853 – May 11, 1922) was a Canadian wholesale merchant and political figure in Prince Edward Island, Canada. He represented West Queen's in the House of Commons of Canada in 1904 as a Liberal member.

He was born in Charlottetown, Prince Edward Island, the son of Henry Haszard and Hannah Catherine Cameron. He was educated there and worked for a time as a clerk for a wholesale dry goods firm in Montreal. Haszard returned to Charlottetown in 1873, where he entered business as a broker, insurance agent and manufacturer's representative. Haszard served on the Charlottetown City Council from 1885 to 1886 and from 1894 to 1895.

References 
Bibliography
 
Citations

1853 births
1922 deaths
Charlottetown city councillors
Liberal Party of Canada MPs
Members of the House of Commons of Canada from Prince Edward Island